Woodson Terrace is a city in St. Louis County, Missouri, United States. The population was 4,063 at the 2010 census.

Geography
Woodson Terrace is located at  (38.727301, -90.359369).

Demographics

2020 census
As of the 2020 census, there were 3,950 people living in the city. The racial makeup of the city was 48.7% White, 27.7% African American, 0.8% Native American, 2.0% Asian, 10.8% from other races, and 9.8% from two or more races. Hispanic or Latino of any race were 18.4% of the population.

2010 census
As of the census of 2010, there were 4,063 people, 1,603 households, and 1,019 families living in the city. The racial makeup of the city was 68.5% White, 20.8% African American, 0.3% Native American, 1.5% Asian, 5.8% from other races, and 3.2% from two or more races. Hispanic or Latino of any race were 10.6% of the population.

There were 1,603 households, of which 33.1% had children under the age of 18 living with them, 35.5% were married couples living together, 21.3% had a female householder with no husband present, 6.8% had a male householder with no wife present, and 36.4% were non-families. 28.8% of all households were made up of individuals, and 9.9% had someone living alone who was 65 years of age or older. The average household size was 2.53 and the average family size was 3.12.

The median age in the city was 34.6 years. 25.2% of residents were under the age of 18; 9.2% were between the ages of 18 and 24; 28% were from 25 to 44; 25.6% were from 45 to 64; and 11.8% were 65 years of age or older. The gender makeup of the city was 48.2% male and 51.8% female.

2000 census
As of the census of 2000, there were 4,189 people, 1,689 households, and 1,102 families living in the city. The racial makeup of the city was 84.36% White, 11.60% African American, 0.14% Native American, 1.00% Asian, 1.24% from other races, and 1.65% from two or more races. Hispanic or Latino of any race were 2.48% of the population.

There were 1,689 households, out of which 30.6% had children under the age of 18 living with them, 43.4% were married couples living together, 16.7% had a female householder with no husband present, and 34.7% were non-families. 28.2% of all households were made up of individuals, and 11.0% had someone living alone who was 65 years of age or older. The average household size was 2.48 and the average family size was 3.04.

In the city, the population was spread out, with 25.5% under the age of 18, 9.1% from 18 to 24, 30.5% from 25 to 44, 20.0% from 45 to 64, and 14.8% who were 65 years of age or older. The median age was 36 years. For every 100 females, there were 92.9 males. For every 100 females age 18 and over, there were 88.1 males.

The median income for a household in the city was $36,363, and the median income for a family was $40,603. Males had a median income of $32,444 versus $23,842 for females. The per capita income for the city was $18,581. About 5.9% of families and 7.7% of the population were below the poverty line, including 9.9% of those under age 18 and none of those age 65 or over.

References

External links
 City of Woodson Terrace official website

Cities in St. Louis County, Missouri
Cities in Missouri